Odo Feliks Kazimierz Bujwid (30 November 1857 in Vilnius – 26 December 1942 in Kraków) (sometimes referred to as Odon Bujwid) was a Polish bacteriologist, recognized as the founder of bacteriology in Poland.

References

1857 births
1942 deaths
Polish bacteriologists
Physicians from Vilnius
Polish Esperantists
University of Warsaw alumni
Burials at Rakowicki Cemetery